Laura Tunbridge,  (born 1974) is a British musicologist and academic, specialising in 19th and 20th-century music, Robert Schumann, and opera. She has been Professor of Music at the University of Oxford since 2017 and a Fellow of St Catherine's College, Oxford since 2014. Previously, she taught at the University of Reading and the University of Manchester.

Biography
Tunbridge studied music at The Queen's College, Oxford, graduating with a Bachelor of Arts (BA) degree in 1996. She studied for a Master of Arts (MA) degree in musicology from the University of Nottingham, graduating in 1997 with a distinction. She then moved to the United States where she studied for Master of Fine Arts (MFA) and Doctor of Philosophy (PhD) degrees at Princeton University: she completed her PhD in musicology in 2002.

Tunbridge began her academic career as a lecturer in music at the University of Reading from 2002 to 2004. She then moved to the University of Manchester where she was a senior lecturer in music analysis and critical theory. In October 2014, she joined the University of Oxford, and was elected a Fellow and tutor in music at St Catherine's College, Oxford. In 2017, she was awarded a Title of Distinction as Professor of Music.

In 2020, she was elected a Member of the Academia Europaea (MAE). In 2021, she was elected a Fellow of the British Academy (FBA), the United Kingdom's national academy for the humanities and social sciences.

Selected works

References

Living people
1974 births
British musicologists
Women musicologists
21st-century musicologists
Academics of the University of Reading
Academics of the University of Manchester
Fellows of St Catherine's College, Oxford
Fellows of the British Academy
Members of Academia Europaea
Alumni of The Queen's College, Oxford
Alumni of the University of Nottingham
Princeton University alumni